Leroy is an unincorporated community in Winfield Township, Lake County, Indiana. The town was founded on December 11, 1875, by Thomas McClann. The town sign at the intersection of U.S. 231 and Elkhart Street describes Leroy as "One of Lake County's First Irish Settlements". The town contains the Living Testimony Church, which was founded in 1888 and still holds services to this day.

Geography

References

Unincorporated communities in Lake County, Indiana
Unincorporated communities in Indiana
populated places established in 1875
1875 establishments in Indiana